Tom McCants (born November 27, 1962) is a retired American high jumper.

He finished twelfth at the 1987 World Championships. He also competed at the 1989 World Indoor Championships without reaching the final.

His personal best jump is 2.37 metres, achieved in May 1988 in Columbus, Ohio.

References

 

1962 births
Living people
American male high jumpers